Dencik is a surname. Notable people with the surname include:

Daniel Dencik (born 1972), Danish writer and film director
David Dencik (born 1974), Swedish-Danish actor
Lina Dencik, British social scientist